The Puchong Perdana Mosque is a mosque in Puchong Perdana township in Puchong, Selangor, Malaysia near Puchong Lake.

It was constructed between 2004 and 2006.

See also
 Islam in Malaysia

2006 establishments in Malaysia
Mosques completed in 2006
Mosques in Selangor
Petaling District